The 2006 World Sambo Championships were held in Sofia, Bulgaria on November 3 to 5 for men's and women's Sambo, and the 2006 Combat Sambo championships were held in Tashkent, Uzbekistan on September 30 to October 2

Medal overview

Combat Sambo Events

Men's Sambo Events

Women's events

Medal table

External links 
 

World Sambo Championships
World Sambo Championships, 2006
World Sambo Championships, 2006
Sports competitions in Sofia
Sport in Tashkent
2006 in sambo (martial art)
21st century in Tashkent